Fayette County Reservoir is a power station cooling reservoir on Cedar Creek in the Colorado River basin, 3 miles west of Fayetteville, Texas and 10 miles east of La Grange, Texas.  The reservoir was created in 1978 when a dam was built on the creek to provide a cooling pond for the Fayette Power Project which provides electrical generation to Fayette County and surrounding areas.  The dam, lake, and power plant are managed by the Lower Colorado River Authority.  The lake is also used for recreational purposes, especially fishing.

Fayette County Reservoir is also known as Lake Fayette.

Fish and plant populations
Fayette County Reservoir has been stocked with species of fish intended to improve the utility of the reservoir for recreational fishing.  Fish present in Fayette County Reservoir include catfish, largemouth bass, and sunfish.

Recreational uses
Boating and fishing are both popular recreational uses of the lake. There is also a playground, a 3 mile trail connecting Oak Thicket Park and Park Prairie Park, and a nature trail in Oak Thicket Park.

Lake Fayette used to be the site of a small town called Biegel which was famous for its pickles.  Outlines of houses may be visible on fish finders.

External links
Fayette County Reservoir - Texas Parks & Wildlife
Lower Colorado River Authority

Fayette County
Protected areas of Fayette County, Texas
Lower Colorado River Authority
Bodies of water of Fayette County, Texas
Cooling ponds